RCAF Station Vulcan, also referred to as  RCAF Aerodrome Vulcan, was a Second World War flying training station located southwest of the town of Vulcan, Alberta, Canada. It was one of many stations that were established in Canada under the British Commonwealth Air Training Plan.

History
The Vulcan aerodrome hosted No. 2 Flying Instructor School (FIS), which was formally established at the station on 3 August 1942. However No. 2 FIS started training at RCAF Station Claresholm on 27 April 1942 under the control of No. 15 Service Flying Training School.  The aircraft used were Cornells, Cranes, Fawns, Finches, Harvards, Oxfords, Tiger Moths and Ansons. On 3 May 1943, No. 2 FIS moved to the Pearce aerodrome near Fort Macleod and No. 19 Service Flying Training School (SFTS) took over the facilities, training future bomber pilots using the Anson. No. 19 SFTS ceased operation on April 14, 1945. Relief or auxiliary landing fields were located at Ensign and Champion.

Aerodrome
Three runways were listed as follows:

Relief landing field – Ensign
The primary Relief Landing Field (R1) for RCAF Station Vulcan was located east of the community of Ensign, Alberta. Three runways were listed as follows:

Relief landing field – Champion
The secondary Relief Landing Field (R2) for RCAF Station Vulcan was located approximately southwest of the community of Champion, Alberta. The aerodrome was listed as "Turf" and "All-way field" with two runways listed as follows:

Postwar
For a period of time the old station operated as the Vulcan Industrial Airport.  Although the runways still exist, the aerodrome has seen many aircraft since the war. Six of the original seven hangars remain standing.  The remaining hangars are used for storage and for private industrial purposes. Three of the building owners are working to restore their hangars.

In 2009 new ownership began re-invigorating the airport. In 2011 it was reopened as Vulcan/Kirkcaldy Aerodrome, operated by Wheatland Industries. The aerodrome is currently being used by private aircraft and one spray plane company.

This is the main operating field for the Southern Alberta Gliding Centre of the Air Cadet Gliding Program.

See also
Vulcan Airport

References

 BCATP Information from Bombercrew.com Retrieved: 2010-09-20
 Bruce Forsyth - Canadian Military History - Alberta Retrieved: 2015-02-22

Vulcan
Vulcan
Vulcan